The Indian locomotive class WAG-1 is a class of 25 kV AC electric locomotives that was imported from Europe in 1960s for Indian Railways. The model name stands for broad gauge (W), AC Current (A), Goods traffic (G) engine, 1st (1). A total of 112 WAG-1 locomotives were built by The European Group 50 Hz Group/European Group/50 Cycles Group (consortium) between 1963 and 1966. They entered service in 1964.

The WAG-1 served both passenger and freight trains for over 40 years. As of January 2002, All locomotives have been removed from service all but one were scrapped.

History 
Forty-two locomotives of this type were ordered from European Group. Five of these were completely assembled in Europe and the remaining were built at CLW. A repeat order was placed on for 20 locomotives in 1963. Further these locomotives were manufactured at CLW. The typical feature of these locomotive is the Monomotor bogies. This construction results in substantial saving in weight in traction equipment and gives better adhesion. The traction motors are force ventilated and are fully suspended type. These motors are permanently grouped in parallel and are controlled by tap changer and field weakening. This can be used for a multiple unit operation to a maximum of four locomotives. Compressed air brake for the loco and vacuum brake for the train are provided, in addition, these locomotives have been provided with regenerative braking. Few locomotives have been converted to dual brake system. They were in service until 2002 when all were scrapped. The first indigenously produced WAG-1 Bidhaan is preserved at the National Rail Museum, New Delhi.

Variants
WAG-1S

Specification 
Build dates: 1963-66
Wheel arrangement: B-B ( monomotor bogies )
Traction motors: AEC/Alstom/Siemens MG1420. Two motors (monomotor bogies), force-ventilated, fully suspended.
Gear ratio: 3.95:1
Transformer: MFO, type BOT 3150. 22.5 kV / 3000 kVA. 32 taps.
Rectifiers: Secheron A268 Excitrons (four). 510 A / 1250 V.
Axle load: 21.3 t
Max. Haulage: 1820 t
Pantographs: Two Faiveley AM-12

Locomotive shed 
  All the locomotives of this class has been withdrawn from service.

See also

Rail transport in India#History
Indian Railways
Locomotives of India
Rail transport in India

References

External links 
[IRFCA] Indian Railways FAQ: Locomotives—Specific classes : AC Electric
[IRFCA] Indian Railways FAQ: Diesel and Electric Locomotive Specifications
11081 Colour Photographs, Indian Railways

25 kV AC locomotives
B-B locomotives
Electric locomotives of India
Railway locomotives introduced in 1964
5 ft 6 in gauge locomotives
Chittaranjan Locomotive Works locomotives